Ap Chuni Dorji is a Bhutanese poet and creator of perhaps the most famous yak song ever written. He was partaking in the art of "lozey" - a poetry tradition among yak herders in Bhutan where the competing herders try and create rich metaphorical and symbolic poems that outdo their counterpart - when he came up with his song "Yak Legpai Lhadar Gawo".

The song
The song is about a handsome yak (Legpai Lhadar Gawo) who was ordered to be taken from his beloved herder and slaughtered for meat. The song gained great popularity, and its sad, haunting tune and message brought tears to listeners' eyes. Chuni gained great popularity, being asked to sing his song wherever he went, and other herders would pay him not to challenge them in lozey. Over the years, however, the lyrics and meaning of the song have been shortened and often reworded. Dorji is now an old man in his 80s living a quiet life in the mountains, but he has still been known to sing his song for curious tourists.

An English translation of Dorji's yak song:

"How beautiful is Yak Legpai Lhadar’s face!
Yak Legpai Lhadar – the god-sent calf!

There is no need to describe my place and paths,
If I were to explain my place and paths,
It is on the high snow-capped mountains
And the highland meadow of sershog flower
Where flower buds blossom. There, my home is.

I graze on mountains grass,
And drink fresh water of glacial lakes.
Should I dance my happiness,
I dance along the base of distant meadows.
One by one, the whole herd was slaughtered!
And I, the unfortunate Lhadar
It is I, Lhadar who feel sad.
A heavy command of a powerful lord came,
A man with a sword fastened at his waist
Came to take me, Lhadar.
Lhadar has no choice not to go.
When turn to be slaughtered is set
The turn fell on me, Lhadar.
Crossing mountains, a Highlander came.
And when the Highlander came,
The snow-covered peaks above, how high?
And Lhadar’s tree of life, how low?"

References

Bhutanese poets